Margaret Anne Tennant is a New Zealand historian, currently Professor Emeritus at Massey University.

Tennant's Masters thesis, completed in 1976, was called Matrons with a mission, and was a study of women's organisations 1893–1915.

Tennant has written for Te Ara: The Encyclopedia of New Zealand.

Tennant was elected a Fellow of the Royal Society of New Zealand in 2009 and is currently on the Council. In 2017, Tennant was selected as one of the Royal Society Te Apārangi's "150 women in 150 words", celebrating the contributions of women to knowledge in New Zealand.

Selected works
 Past Judgement: Social Policy in New Zealand History Bronwyn Dalley and Margaret Tennant, Otago University Press. ISBN 
 Paupers & providers : charitable aid in New Zealand Allen & Unwin,  1989. 
 Children's health, the nation's wealth : a history of children's health camps Bridget Williams Books, 1994. 
 Through the prison gate : 125 years of prisoners' aid and rehabilitation New Zealand Prisoners' Aid & Rehabilitation Society, 2002. 
 Matrons with a mission : women's organisations in New Zealand, 1893-1915 MA Thesis, Massey University, 1976 http://hdl.handle.net/10179/5755

References

External links
 Google Scholar 
 Institutional homepage

Living people
20th-century New Zealand historians
New Zealand women historians
New Zealand biographers
20th-century New Zealand women writers
Fellows of the Royal Society of New Zealand
Massey University alumni
Academic staff of the Massey University
Year of birth missing (living people)
Women biographers
21st-century New Zealand historians